The following is a timeline of the history of the city of Santa Ana, California, USA.

Prior to 20th century

 1877 – Southern Pacific Railroad begins operating.
 1886 – Santa Ana incorporated.
 1889
 Santa Ana becomes seat of Orange County.
 Howe-Waffle House (residence) built.

20th century

 1901 – County Courthouse built.
 1905 – Santa Ana Daily Register newspaper begins publication.
 1912 – Auditorium Theatre built.
 1919 – Orange County Historical Society founded.
 1923 – Santa Ana Business and Professional Women's Club active (approximate date).
 1924 – Walker Theatre opens.
 1933 – The 6.4  Long Beach earthquake shakes the Greater Los Angeles Area and the South Coast of California with a maximum Mercalli intensity of VIII (Severe), killing 115–120 people.
 1935 – Santa Ana Independent newspaper begins publication.
 1970 – Population: 156,601.
 1973 – Orange County Historical Commission established.
 1974 – Heritage Orange County founded.
 1983 – Discovery Museum of Orange County founded.
 1985 – Orange County Register newspaper in publication.
 1988 – Habitat for Humanity of Orange County and Old Courthouse Museum established.
 1990
 Sikh Center of Orange County established.
 Population: 293,742.
 1994 – Miguel A. Pulido becomes mayor.
 1997
 City website online (approximate date).
 Loretta Sanchez becomes U.S. representative for California's 46th congressional district.
 2000 – Population: 337,977.

21st century

 2015 – Population: 335,264.
 2017 – Santa Ana becomes an immigrant sanctuary city.

See also
 Santa Ana, California history
 Timelines of other cities in the Southern California area of California: Anaheim, Bakersfield, Long Beach, Los Angeles, Riverside, San Bernardino, San Diego

References

Bibliography

External links

 
 Items related to Santa Ana, various dates (via Digital Public Library of America).

 
santa ana